The K-9 film series, consists of buddy cop comedy film including one theatrical film, one made-for-television film, and two straight-to-home video films. The general plot centers around a hard-boiled police detective and the German Shepherd police dogs they have as their respective partner and the cases they work together to solve; with the spin-off TV movie, which was initially developed as a pilot episode for a television series before it was passed on, revolves around a police detective who is teamed up with a mechanically enhanced German Shepperd to solve a criminal investigation.

The film series as a whole has been met with generally negative reviews. K-9 was successful at the box-office. It was met with mixed critical reception, but was praised for its use of comedy and for the dog training that was done for the animal actors that portrayed Jerry Lee. Conversely, the sequels were criticized for their pacing, their "strained credibility"; and for the use of potty humor.

Films

K-9 (1989)

Officer Michael Dooley prefers working alone, but while working a case involving the notorious drug lord named Lyman, his boss assigns him a partner. The assigned companion is Jerry Lee, a German Shepherd detection police dog in the canine unit. Initially irritated by the animal, Dooley learns how valuable Jerry Lee is. The dog assists him with tracking down and arresting cohorts of Lyman. When his girlfriend, Tracy, is abducted by Lyman and his men, Dooley crashes a party at their mansion demanding her safe return. With no supporting evidence, he is arrested by another police officer from his own department. Jerry Lee assists in helping Dooley escape custody, so that they can pursue Lyman and free Tracy. Dooley hijacks a truck filled with Lyman's next shipment of drugs, as collateral for his girlfriend's freedom. He threatens to blow up the truck, only for a shootout to break out. As Lyman tries to escape via helicopter, Jerry Lee chases him down. Opening fire on the dog, the canine is hit. Lyman is in turn killed by his own men. Jerry Lee recovers following an emergency operation, and he, Dooley, and Tracy take a relaxing vacation from policing in Las Vegas, Nevada.

K-9000 (1991)

Developed as a pilot for a television series based on the plot of K-9 by Steven Siegel and Scott Myers, the project was released as a TV movie instead followed by straight-to-home video release on VHS. The plot includes:

Hard-edged police officer, Detective Eddie Monroe, who has little to no skill with technology, works to apprehend the edgiest criminals. During an animal rights protest organized by activist Mrs. Wiffington, a heist organized by the villainous Anton Zeiss involving a powerful weapon takes place. Following the disappearance of the device, Monroe's boss assigns him the case. The job requires a new partner, and is teamed up with a cybernetically enhanced German Shepherd police dog named Niner. The product of female scientist Dr. Aja Turner, the dog is implanted with a computer-chip in its brain as a supersoldier program, to magnify its abilities to track and capture perpetrators. Upon teaming up with Niner, Monroe receives a microchip implant that allows communication between him and Niner. Working together the team pursues Zeiss, and a police chase ensues. Following a lengthy fight, Zeiss's plan is thwarted. Mrs. Wiffington is revealed to have been in partnership with Zeiss. With the case closed, a complicated procedure under the operation of a computer program removes the implant from Monroe, though their extrasensory telecommunication abilities remains. Dr. Turner allows the policeman to keep the tech-dog. Taking a break from police task, Monroe takes Niner on a tropic vacation.

K-911 (1999)

Detective Michael Dooley and his faithful German shepherd partner Jerry Lee, have worked together in a partnership of 10 years apprehending criminals. Jerry Lee has aged considerably, due to the difference in dog years, and struggles to keep up with police responsibilities. The partnership, assigned in solving case involving a mysterious murderous criminal, scrambles to crack the case. Dooley reluctantly teams up with fellow Sgt. Wendy Wells and her Dobermann Pinscher named Zeus, in perusing the gun-wielding psychopath. Confronting the lawbreaker Devon Lane, its revealed that the sociopath is motivated by his resolve that Dooley's late-wife Tracy was in love with him, based on her previous compliment of his talents, and is convinced that the policeman is guilty for her death. Lane attacks the officer, and attempts to kill him in a climatic showdown. Just before Dooley is eliminated, Jerry Lee springs into action and tackles the offender resulting in his arrest. Dooley is taken to the hospital for gunshot treatments, and recovers with his companion Jerry Lee by his side.

K-9: P.I. (2002)

Approaching and finally ready to settle into retirement years, a retirement party for Detective Mike Dooley and his partner and police dog Jerry Lee. On their way home after celebrating, the pair come across a robbery at the LA Micro Labs. They give chase to the industrial thief, but he escapes after murdering several security guards. Believing that the criminal has stolen a valuable advanced-tech microchip, Dooley decides to approach the law enforcement. However, in doing so he inadvertently find themselves in the middle of an investigation as the criminal suspects. With his pension now frozen until his name is cleared, Dooley determines to solve the case. With the help of Jerry Lee, the team sets out to find the criminals and clear their names. However, since he's a suspect of an F.B.I. examination and therefore unable to access his old police resources, Dooley creates his own private investigation firm. His first client is woman searching for her missing fiancé, a questionable figure who Dooley determines may be involved with the technology theft. Shortly thereafter, he discovers that Jerry Lee swallowed the missing microchip. After apprehending the accomplice, and determining the burglar's identity, Dooley sets in motion a plan to feign a bribery exchange of money for the microchip. Dooley and Jerry Lee arrest the perpetrator and return the technology to its rightful owner, clearing their names from any association with the crime. Celebrating their success, the duo re-enter their retirement.

Principal cast

Additional crew and production details

Reception

Box office performance

Critical and public response

References 

American film series